A Hoogsteen base pair is a variation of base-pairing in nucleic acids such as the A•T pair. In this manner, two nucleobases, one on each strand, can be held together by hydrogen bonds in the major groove. A Hoogsteen base pair applies the N7 position of the purine base (as a hydrogen bond acceptor) and C6 amino group (as a donor), which bind the Watson–Crick (N3–C4) face of the pyrimidine base.

History
Ten years after James Watson and Francis Crick published their model of the DNA double helix, Karst Hoogsteen reported a crystal structure of a complex in which analogues of A and T formed a base pair that had a different geometry from that described by Watson and Crick. Similarly, an alternative base-pairing geometry can occur for G•C pairs. Hoogsteen pointed out that if the alternative hydrogen-bonding patterns were present in DNA, then the double helix would have to assume a quite different shape. Hoogsteen base pairs are observed in alternative structures such as the four-stranded G-quadruplex structures that form in DNA and RNA.

Chemical properties
Hoogsteen pairs have quite different properties from Watson–Crick base pairs. The angle between the two glycosidic bonds (ca. 80° in the A• T pair) is larger and the C1′–C1′ distance (ca. 860 pm or 8.6 Å) is smaller than in the regular geometry. In some cases, called reversed Hoogsteen base pairs, one base is rotated 180° with respect to the other.

In some DNA sequences, especially CA and TA dinucleotides, Hoogsteen base pairs exist as transient entities that are present in thermal equilibrium with standard Watson–Crick base pairs. The detection of the transient species required the use of NMR relaxation dispersion spectroscopy applied to macromolecules.

Hoogsteen base pairs have been observed in protein–DNA complexes. Some proteins have evolved to recognize only one base-pair type, and use intermolecular interactions to shift the equilibrium between the two geometries.

DNA has many features that allow its sequence-specific recognition by proteins. This recognition was originally thought to primarily involve specific hydrogen-bonding interactions between amino-acid side chains and bases. But it soon became clear that there was no identifiable one-to-one correspondence — that is, there was no simple code to be read. Part of the problem is that DNA can undergo conformational changes that distort the classical double helix. The resulting variations alter the presentation of DNA bases to proteins molecules and thus affect the recognition mechanism.

As distortions in the double helix are themselves are dependent on base sequence, proteins are able to recognize DNA in a manner similar to the way that they recognize other proteins and small ligand molecules, i.e. via geometric shape (instead of the specific sequence). For example, stretches of A and T bases can lead to narrowing the minor groove of DNA (the narrower of the two grooves in the double helix), resulting in enhanced local negative electrostatic potentials which in turn creates binding sites for positively charged arginine amino-acid residues on the protein.

Triplex structures

This non-Watson–Crick base-pairing allows the third strands to wind around the duplexes, which are assembled in the Watson–Crick pattern, and form triple-stranded helices such as (poly(dA)•2poly(dT)) and (poly(rG)•2poly(rC)). It can be also seen in three-dimensional structures of transfer RNA, as T54•A58 and U8•A14.

Triple-helix base pairing
Watson–Crick base pairs are indicated by a "•", "-", or a "." (example: A•T, or poly(rC)•2poly(rC)).

Hoogsteen triple-stranded DNA base pairs are indicated by a "*" or a ":" (example: C•G*C+, T•A*T, C•G*G, or T•A*A).

Quadruplex structures
Hoogsteen pairs also allows formation of secondary structures of single stranded DNA and RNA G-rich called G-quadruplexes (G4-DNA and G4-RNA). Evidence exists for both in vitro and in vivo formation of G4s. Genomic G4s have been suggested to regulate gene transcription and at the RNA level inhibit protein synthesis through steric inhibition of ribosome function. It needs four triplets of G, separated by short spacers. This permits assembly of planar quartets which are composed of stacked associations of Hoogsteen bonded guanine molecules.

See also
 Wobble base pair
 G-quadruplex
 Guanine tetrad
 Nucleic acid tertiary structure
 Polypurine reverse-Hoogsteen hairpins (PPRHs), oligonucleotides that can bind either DNA or RNA and decrease gene expression.

References

Nucleic acids